The 2006–07 Argentina Primera Division was the 116th season of first division football in Argentina. Estudiantes (LP) won the Torneo Apertura and San Lorenzo won the Torneo Clausura. Belgrano and Quilmes were relegated to the Primera B Nacional and Huracan and Tigre were promoted after winning the relegation playoff against Godoy Cruz and Nueva Chicago respectively.

Torneo Apertura

Championship playoff
Boca Juniors and Estudiantes LP ended up tied in points at the end of the 19 weeks of regular season. Tournament rules establish that, unlike any other position on the table, if two or more teams are equal in points at the end of play, goal difference does not count and a playoff game is required. Estudiantes won that match and was crowned as champion.

Top scorers

Torneo Clausura
By matchday 8, seven coaches had already been fired by their respective teams.

Top scorers

Relegation

Updated as of June 22, 2008; Source:AFA

Promotion playoff

|-
!colspan="5"|Relegation/promotion playoff 1

|-
!colspan="5"|Relegation/promotion playoff 2

Huracán was promoted to 2007–08 Primera División by winning the playoff and Godoy Cruz was relegated to 2007–08 Primera B Nacional.
Tigre was promoted to 2007–08 Primera División by winning the playoff and Nueva Chicago was relegated to 2007–08 Primera B Nacional.

See also

2006–07 in Argentine football

References

1
Argentine Primera División seasons
p
p